Murino is a town in Vsevolozhsky District of Leningrad Oblast, Russia, located east of and immediately adjacent to the city of St. Petersburg. Formerly a settlement, it was granted a town status on 27 March 2019. The population estimates of Murino are about 50 thousand.

Administrative and municipal status
Within the framework of administrative divisions, it is incorporated, together with the village of Lavriki, within Vsevolozhsky District as Murinskoye Settlement Municipal Formation. As a municipal division, Murinskoye Settlement Municipal Formation is incorporated within Vsevolozhsky Municipal District as Murinskoye Urban Settlement.

Economy

Transportation
Devyatkino station, a metro station of the Saint Petersburg Metro, and the eponymous railway station, are located in Murino. The railway line, Saint Petersburg–Hiitola railway, connects Finland Station of Saint Petersburg with Priozersk via Sosnovo. Murino railway station is on the same line but it is located in Saint Petersburg rather than in Murino.

The Saint Petersburg Ring Road crosses the southern part of Murino and has two exits within the city limits. Murino, being adjacent to the city of Saint Petersburg, is integrated into its road network. It does not have direct connections with Vsevolozhsk, the district center, and connection proceeds via the Ring Road.

References

Notes

Sources

Cities and towns in Leningrad Oblast
Vsevolozhsky District
Sankt-Peterburgsky Uyezd